The language of the kingdom of Baekje (4th to 7th centuries), one of the Three Kingdoms of Korea, is poorly attested, and scholars differ on whether one or two languages were used. However, at least some of the material appears to be variety of Old Korean.

Description in early texts 

Baekje was preceded in southwestern Korea by the Mahan confederacy.
The Chinese Records of the Three Kingdoms (3rd century) states that the language of Mahan differed from that of Goguryeo to the north and the other Samhan ('Three Han') to the east, Byeonhan and Jinhan, whose languages were said to resemble each other.
However, the Book of the Later Han (5th century) speaks of differences between the languages of Byeonhan and Jinhan.

Historians believe that Baekje was established by immigrants from Goguryeo who took over Mahan, while Byeonhan and Jinhan were succeeded by Gaya and Silla respectively.
According to Book of Liang (635), the language of Baekje was similar to that of Goguryeo.
Chapter 49 of the Book of Zhou (636) says of Baekje:

Based in this passage and some Baekje words cited in the Japanese history  (720), many scholars, beginning with Kōno Rokurō and later Kim Bang-han, have argued that the kingdom of Baekje was bilingual, with the gentry speaking a Puyŏ language and the common people a Han language.
The Linguist List defined two codes for these languages, and these have been taken over into the ISO 639-3 registry.

Linguistic data 

There are no extant texts in the Baekje language. The primary contemporary lexical evidence comes from a few glosses in Chinese and Japanese histories, as well as proposed etymologies for old place names.

Nihon Shoki 
The Japanese history , compiled in the early 8th century from earlier documents, including some from Baekje, records 42 Baekje words. These are transcribed as Old Japanese syllables, which are restricted to the form (C)V, limiting the precision of the transcription.

Early Japan imported many artifacts from Baekje and the Gaya confederacy, and several of the above matching Old Japanese forms are believed to have been borrowed from Baekje at that time.
Such borrowing would also explain the fact that words such as  'father',  'fortress',  'district' and  'hawk' are limited to Western Old Japanese, with no cognates in Eastern Old Japanese or Ryukyuan languages.
Moreover, for some words, like 'father' and 'mother', there are alternative words in Old Japanese that are attested across the Japonic family ( and  respectively).
Bentley lists these words, as well as  'bear' and  'village', as loans into Old Japanese from Baekje. Alexander Vovin argues that the only Baekje words from the Nihon Shoki found throughout Japonic, such as  island and  'bear', are those also common to Koreanic.

Other histories 

Chapter 49 of the Chinese Book of Zhou (636) cites three Baekje words:
  'king' (used by the gentry)
  'king' (used by commoners)
  'queen'

Chapter 54 of the Book of Liang (635) gives four Baekje words:
  'ruling fortress'
  'settlement'
  'short jacket'
  'pants'
None of these have Koreanic etymologies, but Vovin suggests that the first might be cognate with Old Japanese  'enclose', and the second with Old Japanese  'house' +  'circle'.
He views this as limited evidence for Kōno's two-language hypothesis, and suggests that the language of the commoners may have been the same Peninsular Japonic language reflected by placename glosses in the Samguk sagi from the northern part of Baekje captured by Goguryeo in the 5th century.

Wooden tablets 
Wooden tablets dated to the late Baekje era have been discovered by archaeologists, and some of them involve the rearrangement of Classical Chinese words according to native syntax. From this data, the word order of Baekje appears to have been similar to that of Old Korean. Unlike in Silla texts, however, no uncontroversial evidence of non-Chinese grammatical morphemes has been found. Compared to Silla tablets, Baekje tablets are far more likely to employ conventional Classical Chinese syntax and vocabulary without any native influence.

The tablets also give the names of 12 locations and 77 individuals. A total of 147 phonographic characters have been identified from these proper nouns, but this is insufficient to allow a reconstruction of the phonology.

A tablet found in the Baekje-built temple of Mireuksa, originally thought to be a list of personal names, appears to record native numerals, possibly a series of dates. Although the tablet is dated to the early Later Silla period, postdating the 660 fall of Baekje, its orthography differs from conventional Old Korean orthography. In the extant Silla texts, a native numeral is written by a logogram-phonogram sequence, but in this tablet, they are written entirely with phonograms (both phonetically and semantically adapted). Lee Seungjae thus suggests that the tablet is written in Baekje numerals. The numerals appear Koreanic, with a suffix   that may be cognate to the Early Middle Korean ordinal suffix .

See also
History of the Korean language
Old Korean
Goguryeo language

Notes

References

Works cited 

 
 
 
 
 
 
 
 
 
 
 
 
 

Baekje
Extinct languages of Asia
History of the Korean language
Languages of Korea
Han languages